Ypiranga Futebol Clube, commonly referred to as Ypiranga de Erechim or Ypiranga, is a Brazilian professional club based in Erechim, Rio Grande do Sul founded on 18 August 1924. It competes in the Campeonato Brasileiro Série C, the third tier of Brazilian football, as well as in the Campeonato Gaúcho, the top flight of the Rio Grande do Sul state football league.

History
The origins of Ypiranga Futebol Clube go back to the rivalry with the Ítalo-Brasileiro, then the only club in the city of Erechim. In 1924, a match between the Ítalo-Brasileiro and Douradense, team from Linha Dourado, was being played in the field where today is located the Júlio de Castilhos square, in the center of Erechim. A group of people who had recently arrived in town showed support for Douradense - a fact that caused a general confusion at the end of the match. The next day, gathered in the ballroom of the Hotel Central on Avenida Maurício Cardoso, the group of soccer enthusiasts decided to create a new club. Their patriotic motivation gave the new association the colors green and yellow, as well as a name that referred to Brazil's independence: on 18 August 1924, Ypiranga Futebol Clube was born. Among the founders, names like Arthur Incerti, Favorino Pinto, Ercilia Di Francesco Amorim, Fioravante Tagliari, Florêncio Antunes de Oliveira, Francisco de Oliveira Dias, Heraclides Franco, Jacinto Godoy, João Antonio Sírtoli, João Magnabosco, João Reis Solon, João Vitorino dos Reis are registered, José Maria de Amorim, Lizandro Araújo, Nilo Amorim, Otto Feldmann, Paulo Damasceno Ferreira, Sigismundo Pllak, Sebastião César, Silvestre Péricles Monteiro - later on the author of the club's anthem -, Simão Vasconcelos de Souza, Themistocles Ochoa, Theodoro Tedesco, and Vitório Alovise.

Stadium

Since the beginning of its activities in the soccer department, in 1924, Ypiranga played its matches in a stadium known as "Estádio da Montanha", located at Rua Bento Gonçalves, Ipiranga district, in a field that deteriorated over time and was abandoned. At that time, the club's headquarters was on Rua Alemanha, in the city center.

After receiving the support of the club's president in 1964, Oscar Abal, the idea of building its own stadium was started, on a piece of land that had a lagoon and a quarry around it. In 1967, the construction of Ypiranga's own stadium began, located on Avenida Sete de Setembro, considered one of the city's most traditional avenues. The enterprise only became viable due to the sale of patrimonial titles and with the raffle of cars and household appliances, in a moment when the club reached 50 thousand patrimonial members, including abroad. With the decision taken, it also became necessary to sell and subsequently demolish the Mountain Stadium to pay for the financial costs of building its own stadium.

The capacity of the stadium Colosso da Lagoa, at the time of its construction, was 30,000 people. However, with the standardization of soccer in order to avoid problems caused by overcrowding, its maximum capacity was reduced to 22,000 spectators. This reduction is also due to the implementation of two thousand white chairs in a sector of the bleachers, which come from the Estádio Beira-Rio, which would no longer be used after the renovation made for the 2014 FIFA World Cup. Despite the reduction in capacity by about eight thousand seats, the Colosso da Lagoa is the fourth stadium in number of spectators in Rio Grande do Sul, and the largest in the countryside.

Honours
 Campeonato Gaúcho Série A2
 Winners (5): 1967, 1989, 2008, 2014, 2019

References

External links
 Official Site
 Ypiranga on Globo Esporte

Ypiranga Futebol Clube
Association football clubs established in 1924
Football clubs in Rio Grande do Sul
Football clubs in Brazil
1924 establishments in Brazil